NGC 263 is a spiral galaxy located in the constellation Cetus. It was discovered in 1886 by Francis Leavenworth.

References

External links
 

0263
Cetus (constellation)
Spiral galaxies
002856